Kedainiai Stadium is a multi-use stadium in Kėdainiai, Lithuania.  It is currently used mostly for football matches and is the home stadium of FK Nevėžis.  The stadium holds 3,000 people.

References

Buildings and structures in Kėdainiai
Football venues in Lithuania